Robert Maddox (born June 23, 1954) is an American football coach and former player.  He is currently the head football coach at Lee-Scott Academy in Auburn, Alabama.  Maddox served as the head football coach at of the Troy State University—now Troy University—from 1988 to 1990, compiling a record of 13–17.

Early career
Maddox played college football at Troy State University from 1974 through 1977 on defense under defensive coordinator Chan Gailey.  In 1983, Gailey became head coach at Troy State, and hired Maddox as an assistant coach.  Maddox rose in subsequent years to become defensive coordinator at Troy State, and in 1988 was hired as head football coach at his alma mater.

Head coach at Troy State
At Troy State, Maddox inherited a team which the previous season had gone 12–1–1, winning the NCAA Division II Football Championship.  Despite this, in 1988, Troy State had its first losing season since 1982, going 4–6.  The following season, the team showed little improvement, finishing with an identical 4–6 record.  In 1990, Troy State improved slightly to 5–5, but Maddox resigned following a season-ending 24–23 win over Nicholls State.

High school coaching career
Maddox became head coach at Valley High School in Valley, Alabama in 1991, where he immediately led the Rams to the fourth round of the Alabama High School Athletic Association class 5A playoffs and a 12–2 record.  For this, he was named the Alabama High School Football Coach of the Year for class 5A.  He remained at Valley until 1999, amassing a 62–46 record and four region championships.  In 2000, he reentered the college ranks as an assistant coach at Gardner–Webb University, but returned to Alabama in 2002 as the head football coach at Auburn High School.  At Auburn High, Maddox led the Tigers to three consecutive playoff appearances and won the region title in 2004.  After three seasons at Auburn High, Maddox left to become head football coach at Lee-Scott Academy. He retired from coaching football in the spring of 2019.

Head coaching record

College

References

1954 births
Living people
Gardner–Webb Runnin' Bulldogs football coaches
Troy Trojans football coaches
Troy Trojans football players
High school football coaches in Alabama
Auburn High School (Alabama) people
Players of American football from Alabama